Tiantaishan railway station is a railway station in Tiantai County, Taizhou, Zhejiang, China. It is an intermediate stop on the Hangzhou–Taizhou high-speed railway and was opened with the line on 8 January 2022.

There are two island platforms.

References 

Railway stations in Zhejiang
Railway stations in China opened in 2022